WCPX may refer to:

 WCPX-TV, a television station in Chicago, Illinois, United States
 WCPX-LD, a television station in Columbus, Ohio, United States
 WKMG-TV, a television station in Orlando, Florida, United States that previously held the WCPX-TV callsign